Abdullah Al-Rakib (born 2 December 1980) is a Bangladeshi chess player who holds the FIDE title of Grandmaster. He won the Bangladeshi Chess Championship in 2013.

Career
On 25 September 2007, he became the 4th GM from Bangladesh. Rakib should have had his recognition after April at the Board meeting of FIDE. According to Bangladesh Chess Federation, it was a misunderstanding that caused the delay. However, the recognition came in the Presidential Board meeting of FIDE held in 13–14 September in Mexico. Rakib said, "Being Grandmaster is a particular recognition. It does not mean my game restricts here. I know very well about my weaknesses. I have to fix them". Rakib had his first norm in 2001 at Kolkata in "Asian International Chess Competition" and the second one at the "Grandmasters Tournament" of Leonine Chess Club. He achieved his last required norm in April 2007 at the National Championship.

His best results are: 1st at Dhaka 2004; 1st at Destiny Open, Bangladesh 2004; 1st Dhaka 2005; 1st at Mercantile Bank, Bangladesh 2007.

He has represented Bangladesh in seven Chess Olympiads.

References

External links
 
 
 

1980 births
Living people
Bangladeshi chess players
Chess grandmasters